Cumpston Glacier is a small glacier on the east coast of Graham Land, draining between Breitfuss Glacier and Quartermain Glacier into the head of Mill Inlet. It was named by the UK Antarctic Place-Names Committee for J.S. Cumpston, an Australian historian of the Antarctic.

References
 

Glaciers of Graham Land
Foyn Coast